Stephen Devassy (born 23 February 1981) is an Indian musician hailing from Palakkad, Kerala. He started his career at a very early age, and has performed on stage around the world. Stephen is the founder of Musik Lounge, an audio technology school and studio in Chennai.

Early life

Stephen did his schooling at Seventh Day Adventist school, Ottapalam. He went on to NSS College, Ottapalam for pursuing his Pre-Degree .And Stephen married Jesna Joy on 16 November 2010.They have a son Shawn born in 2015.

Career

Devassy's first major break came when he was aged 18, through Johny Sagarika, for whom he did the music orchestration of six songs on the album Ishtamannu. He then went as an accompanying artist to play the keyboard for Hariharan on his European tour.
He has also accompanied the violin maestro L. Subramanian at the Lakshminarayana Global Music Festival.

At age 19, he started a music band called Seven, with singer Franco Simon and guitarist Sangeeth Pavithran. A Indian pop band, they released an album titled YehZindagani 

Stephen, who started performing at a young age, has done the music arrangement for many films. Some of the films he scored were Majaa, Thambi, Nammal, Azhagiya Thamizh Magan and Hariharan's album, Waqt Par Bolna.

Hariharan Pillai Happy Aanu (2003) was his debut music directorial venture in Malayalam. Lyrics were written by famous young lyricst Rajeev Alunkal. The film  "KQ"   (2013) by Baiju Johnson, a story of two hard working friends also had a touch of Stephen's music. Survival thriller of Superstar Mohanlal's  "Neerali" (2018) directed and co-edited by Ajoy Varma is another milestone in his music career .

He is one of the regular band members in Rexband, a Christian contemporary band singing gospel fusion, a musical outreach of the Jesus Youth Movement. He performed with the band before Pope John Paul II during World Youth Day performance in 2002 at Canada. At the time, it was the only catholic band invited from India. Stephen has orchestrated an instrumental version of the popular Rexband melodies called Different Vibes.

In association with Kosmic Music, Stephen has also set to tune to a background of Western music, Sanskrit slokas, mantras and verses from the Upanishads, called Sacred Chants of Kosmic Music, and albums of holy chants on Ganesha, Shiva and Vishnu.

He has also assisted Sarod maestro Amjad Ali Khan with his album of Christmas carols, Breaking Barriers..

He has released his album Romanza, which was a mix of world music sprinkled with the flavor of piano. Indian ragas have been treated with the rich use of contemporary piano. Hariharan, Ouseppachan and a Russian vocalist appeared as guest artists on the album.

Stephen's solo stage shows have propelled him to the top league of onstage performers.

Stephen did the role of an ideal judge in Amrita TV show Superstar Junior (2016), Top Singer (2018-2019) of Flowers channel and currently he is in the panel of most famous music contest Star singer of Asianet.

He got several other opportunities like being guest in many other TV shows. Super Singer Season 1 (2008), Super Singer season 2 (2021) of Vijay TV, Indian voice season 1 (2012) of Mazhavil manorama are few of them.

He was also been guest in many Hindi television shows like The Voice India kids Season 2 (2017) of AND TV, Sa Re Ga Ma Pa Lil Champs (2017) of Zee TV and in the most famous Sony TV show Indian Idol season 12 (2020-2021).

Achievements
Stephen Devassy got certificate of participation in 2019 from Guinness World Records for working on the music of the longest documentary film "100 years of Chrysostom" which enters in Guinness World Records. The documentary was directed by Blessy.

Rotary club of Cochin Excellence Award – 2008

AMMA Award  – Artist of The Year – 2009

Asia Vision Award – 2012

Featured on cover of AUDIBY, (Music and tech magazine) – Nov -Dec 2012

Brands Academy Award For Stephen Devassy's – Muzik Lounge School of Audio Technology – 2013

Featured on 5Talents Magazine Cover Page With His Life Story – 2013

Cosine Award – 2013

Times of India – Brand Icon – 2015

Swaralaya Award – 2016

Music Icon of The Year – Vijay TV – 2018

Best Live Music Performance in India – Indywood Music Excellence Awards – 2018

Guinness World Records – Certificate of Participation – 2019

The Icon of Inspiration Music – Behindwoods Gold Mic Award – 2019

Discography

Television

References

External links

 Stephen Devassy at MSI

Living people
Indian pianists
Malayalam film score composers
Musicians from Palakkad
Composers for piano
Keytarists
1981 births
People from Ottapalam
21st-century Indian musicians
21st-century pianists